Logroñés Club de Fútbol was a Spanish football team based in Logroño, in the autonomous community of La Rioja. Founded in 2000 and dissolved in 2008 it held home games at Estadio Las Gaunas, with a capacity of 16,000 spectators.

History
Logroñés Club de Fútbol was founded in 2000 as Club Deportivo Recreación de La Rioja, but in 2005 changed its name. In 2008–09, after five consecutive seasons in the third division, it was not registered in any official competition.

Club names
CD Recreación - (2000–05)
Logroñés CF - (2005–08)

Season to season

5 seasons in Segunda División B
2 seasons in Tercera División

External links
Official website 

Defunct football clubs in La Rioja (Spain)
Sport in Logroño
Association football clubs established in 2000
Association football clubs disestablished in 2008
2000 establishments in Spain
2008 disestablishments in Spain